A by-election was held for the New South Wales Legislative Assembly electorate of Port Macquarie on 30 November 1996 following the retirement of sitting member, Wendy Machin.

Results

Wendy Machin resigned.

See also
Electoral results for the district of Port Macquarie
List of New South Wales state by-elections

References

1996 elections in Australia
New South Wales state by-elections
1990s in New South Wales